Raj Mohan (born 28 August 1964), is a Dutch singer and songwriter, who sings in Bhojpuri. In 2011 he released his first pop album with Sarnami-Bhojpuri lyrics together with Hindi songs and poems which he all wrote and composed himself. It is the first time in Surinamese history that Surinam Bhojpuri is utilized in this contemporary form. Raj Mohan invented the Sarnámi-Bhojpuri Geet in the Geet & Ghazal style which was appreciated worldwide with his album ‘Kantráki’ (2005).

Early life and career
Raj is a 5th generation Bihari - Indian in Suriname, his ancestors were taken to Suriname as indentured labourers by the British. He was raised in Utrecht, Netherlands and displayed musical talent at an early age.

At the age of 12, Mohan moved to the Netherlands from Suriname with his parents.

References

Living people
1964 births
Bhojpuri playback singers
Dutch pop singers
Dutch singer-songwriters
People from Paramaribo